Lowokwaru is a district (kecamatan) in Malang, East Java, Indonesia. Lowokwaru is the home of notable universities and colleges in Malang.

History
Before 1988, Lowokwaru was just urban villages (kelurahan) and part of Blimbing. In April 1988, the city government of Malang divided from former western side of Blimbing and create Lowokwaru into 12 urban villages.

Urban villages
There are 12 urban villages (kelurahan) in Lowokwaru:

 Jatimulyo, postal code 65141
 Lowokwaru, postal code 65141
 Tulusrejo, postal code 65141
 Mojolangu, postal code 65142
 Tunjungsekar, postal code 65142
 Tasikmadu, postal code 65143
 Tunggulwulung, postal code 65143
 Dinoyo, postal code 65144
 Merjosari, postal code 65144
 Tlogomas, postal code 65144
 Sumbersari, postal code 65145
 Ketawanggede, postal code 65145

Geography

Climate
The climate in Lowokwaru features tropical monsoon climate (Am) according to Köppen–Geiger climate classification system, as the climate precipitation throughout the year is greatly influenced by the monsoon, bordering with subtropical highland climate (Cwb). Most months of the year are marked by significant rainfall. The short dry season has little impact. The average temperature in Lowokwaru is 23.8 °C. In a year, the average rainfall is 2101 mm.

See also 

 Districts of East Java
 List of districts of Indonesia

References

External links 
 Official website of Kecamatan Lowokwaru

Districts of East Java
Malang